In mathematics, Somos' quadratic recurrence constant, named after Michael Somos, is the number

This can be easily re-written into the far more quickly converging product representation 

which can then be compactly represented in infinite product form by:

The constant σ arises when studying the asymptotic behaviour of the sequence

with first few terms 1, 1, 2, 12, 576, 1658880, ... . This sequence can be shown to have asymptotic behaviour as follows:

Guillera and Sondow give a representation in terms of the derivative of the Lerch transcendent: 

where ln is the natural logarithm and (z, s, q) is the Lerch transcendent.

Finally,

 .

Notes

References

 Steven R. Finch, Mathematical Constants (2003), Cambridge University Press, p. 446. .
 Jesus Guillera and Jonathan Sondow, "Double integrals and infinite products for some classical constants via analytic continuations of Lerch's transcendent", Ramanujan Journal 16 (2008), 247–270 (Provides an integral and a series representation). 

Mathematical constants
Infinite products